Fathom is the second album by Christian dance-rock band Mortal, and is generally considered the band's best album. The band produced the album along with Terry Scott Taylor of Daniel Amos. It peaked at No. 32 on the Billboard Top Contemporary Christian chart.

Track listing
Alive and Awake 5:42
Ne Plus Ultra 4:17
Rift 4:22
Jill Sent Me 7:01
Ex-Nihilo 5:16
Above and Beyond 4:38
[Silent track] 0:05
Rainlight 1:34
Bright Wings 6:48 (an adaptation of Gerard Manley Hopkins poem "God's Grandeur")
Xix 0:15
Promulgate 4:18
Electrify 7:06
Godspeed 6:17

Personnel
 Jyro Xhan
 Jerome Fontamillas
 Mark Salomon - vocals
 Jeff Bellew - guitar
 Melissa "Missy" Hasin - cello
 Andrew D. Prickett - guitar
 Strobe - guitar
 Ray Tongpo - vocals
 Macauley N. Tosh - drums, percussion
 Violet - vocals
 Mark A. Rodriguez - engineer
 Lani Agulla
 Linnah Brockman 	
 Sally Grayson 	
 Vicky Pederson

References

1993 albums
Mortal (band) albums